Highbrow may refer to:

 Highbrow, as a noun and adjective
 Highbrow (Transformers), three fictional characters in the Transformers series
 Going Highbrow, a 1935 American comedy-musical film